Hans Andersen Foss (November 25, 1851 – July 9, 1929)  was a Norwegian-American author, newspaper editor and temperance leader. Foss is most noted for his Norwegian language novel, Husmands-gutte (1885) which was translated into English as The Cotter's Son. A story from Sigdal.

Biography
Foss was born  in Modum, Buskerud county, Norway. He was the son of a small tenant farmer, Anders Knudsen Fossen and his wife  Karen Marie Henriksdatter.  Foss immigrated to the United States in 1887.

A lifelong proponent of the temperance movement and the Populist Party, Foss edited several temperance publications.  In 1886–87, he was editor of the Dakota Bladet  magazine in Portland, North Dakota. From 1888 to 1893 served as editor for the Norwegian language newspaper Normanden in Grand Forks, North Dakota. In 1892, Foss was nominated as the North Dakota Populist Party candidate for Congress, but lost the election. Afterwards Foss gave up both politics and the newspaper business and became a grain dealer, eventually settling in Minot, North Dakota during 1906.

Foss wrote a number of novels, many first serialized in Norwegian language newspaper. Foss's writing style made him a popular author among Norwegian-American immigrants. However, Foss's lasting literary contribution is principally his influence on later, more widely known writers such as Peer Stromme and Ole Rølvaag.

Foss is most associated with his 1885 novel, Husmandsgutte, (English: The Cotter's Son).
The book, which tells the story of Ole Haugen, the son of the poor farmer in Sigdal, Norway, is considered by many to be a most accurate depiction of the lifestyle of farm workers in Norway. The popularity of The Cotter's Son serial was credited with saving the Decorah Posten from bankruptcy. The Cotter's Son has long enjoyed popularity in Norway, where numerous editions have been published.

Foss was married twice and had seven children. He died during 1929 in Minot, North Dakota and was buried at Rosehill Memorial Park.

Selected works
Husmandsgutten. En fortælling fra Sigdal  (Decorah, Iowa: DP. 1885)
Livet i Vesterheimen ( Decorah: AP. 1886)
Den amerikanske saloon (Grand Forks, North Dakota: AP. 1889)
Hvide slaver. En social-politisk skildring (Grand Forks, North Dakota: 1892)
Allehaande (Minneapolis, MN: Scandinavian-American Publishing Assn. 1907)Valborg (Decorah, Iowa: DP. 1927)

References

Related reading
Thorson, Gerald   America Is Not Norway: The Story of the Norwegian-American Novel (Unpublished Ph.D. dissertation, Columbia University, 1958)
Øverland, Orm [https://books.google.com/books?id=RmcW1xuAbmoC&pg=PA143&lpg=PA143&dq=Hans+Anderson+Foss&source=bl&ots=rGivuczroX&sig=1FpKsfQBHVYahnkI7oLAI7Je5-g&hl=en&ei=azKgSZfbN4jKNJaqqOoL&sa=X&oi=book_result&resnum=2&ct=result#PPP1,MThe Western Home: A Literary History Of Norwegian America'] (Norwegian-American Historical Association. November 1, 1996)
Lovoll, Odd Sverre  (2010) Norwegian Newspapers in America: Connecting Norway and the New Land (Minnesota Historical Society) , 9780873517720

External links
Read North Dakota - Fiction by North Dakota Authors 
"The Divided Heart: Scandinavian Immigrant Experience Through Literary Sources" by Dorothy Burton Skardal
The Norwegian-American Imprint Collection – Rolvaag Memorial Library
 Goodreads "The Cotter's Son"
 North Dakota Fictional Literary Works 
Norwegian American Historical Association/Newspaper Publications, Decorah-Posten: The Story of an Immigrant Newspaper 

1851 births
1929 deaths
People from Modum
Norwegian emigrants to the United States
People from Minot, North Dakota
North Dakota Populists
19th-century American novelists
20th-century American novelists
American male novelists
Norwegian temperance activists
American temperance activists
19th-century American male writers
20th-century American male writers